Anneli is a female given name common in Finland, Sweden, Estonia and Norway. It originated as a variation of the name Anna. It is listed by the Finnish Population Register Centre as one of the top 10 most popular female given names ever.

Notable people
Some notable people who have this name include:
Anneli Alderton, English murder victim
 Anneli Alhanko, Swedish ballet dancer and actress
 Anneli Björkling, Finnish model
 Anneli Drecker, German-Norwegian singer
 Anneli Drummond-Hay, English show jumper
 Anneli Giske, Norwegian footballer
 Anneli Haaranen (1934–2020), Finnish swimmer
 Anneli Jäätteenmäki, the first female Prime Minister of Finland
 Anneli Lambing (born 1968), Estonian badminton player
 Anneli Magnusson, Swedish Eurodance artist better known by her stagename Pandora
 Anneli Martini (born 1948), Swedish actress.
 Anneli Ott, Estonian politician 
 Annely Peebo, Estonian opera singer
 Anneli Saaristo, Finnish singer and actress
 Anneli Särnblad, Swedish politician

See also
 Annelie

References

Finnish feminine given names
Swedish feminine given names
Norwegian feminine given names
Estonian feminine given names